Work Experience is a 1989 British short comedy film directed by James Hendrie and starring Lenny Henry and Kathy Burke. It won the Academy Award for Best Live Action Short Film at the 62nd Academy Awards.

Cast
 Lenny Henry as Terence Weller
 Kathy Burke as Sally
 Neil Pearson as Greg
 Shelagh Fraser

References

External links

1989 films
1989 short films
1989 comedy films
British independent films
Live Action Short Film Academy Award winners
British comedy short films
1980s English-language films
1980s British films
1989 independent films